The Romanian Women's Volleyball Cup is an annual women's volleyball cup competition held in Romania every year under the control of the Romanian Volleyball Federation (FRV) since the year 2007, CSM Volei Alba Blaj is the current Title holder as well as the alltime record holder with 4 titles

Competition history

Winners list

References

External links
  Romanian Volleyball Federation 

Volleyball in Romania